The Slovenia national football team represents the nation of Slovenia in international association football. The team is controlled by the Football Association of Slovenia (NZS), the nation's governing body for football, and is a member of both the European football federation, UEFA, and the world football association, FIFA.

Prior to Slovenian independence from the Socialist Federal Republic of Yugoslavia in June 1991, the unofficial Slovenian national team played a total of five friendly matches. Shortly after independence, Slovenia was officially recognized by FIFA and played its first match on 3 June 1992, a friendly versus Estonia in Tallinn. In the game, ending in a 1–1 draw, Igor Benedejčič became the first goalscorer for Slovenia after equalizing in the second half. Their first competitive match was a UEFA Euro 1996 qualifier against Italy in September 1994. The team has qualified for the UEFA European Championship once (in 2000) and the FIFA World Cup twice (in 2002 and 2010), and is one of the smallest countries by population to ever qualify for the World Cup. Slovenia was eliminated on all three occasions in the group stage of these competitions. As of 20 November 2022, Slovenia has played a total of 276 official matches, winning 98, drawing 71 and losing 107.

Since 1992, 220 players have represented the national team in official matches. The most capped player is Boštjan Cesar, who has made 101 appearances between 2003 and 2018. The most capped goalkeeper is Samir Handanović with 81 appearances between 2004 and 2015. Zlatko Zahovič is the all-time top goalscorer with 35 goals in his international career, which spanned 13 years between 1992 and 2004. The player with the most appearances as the team captain is Boštjan Cesar, who captained Slovenia in 39 matches. Benjamin Šeško is the youngest player to appear for the national team; he was 18 years and 1 day old at the time of his debut in June 2021.

Key
The list is initially ordered by alphabetical order of surname.
Only players with at least ten appearances in official matches are listed.
Statistics are correct as of the match played on 20 November 2022.

Players

Notes

References
General

Specific

 
Association football player non-biographical articles